George Farnham was executive director of NORML from 1979 to 1982.

Farnham was born into an upperclass, conservative-leaning family in Scarsdale, New York, and attended Washington University in St. Louis, where he discovered the work of gonzo journalist and NORML advisory board member Hunter Thompson. He attended George Washington University Law School, and became an intern at NORML. Farnham began working as an aide in July 1977, lobbying against the U.S. government's spraying of Paraquat in Mexico. In 1979, when NORML director Keith Stroup resigned, Farnham succeeded him and held the position until 1982 when he was replaced by Kevin Zeese.

References

Living people
Year of birth missing (living people)
American cannabis activists
Washington University in St. Louis alumni
George Washington University Law School alumni